José Geraldo Vieira (April 16, 1897 – August 17, 1977) was a Brazilian writer, translator, and literary critic.

Translator 
As a translator, Vieira was James Joyce's first translator in Brazil, and was also one of the first Brazilian writers to be strongly influenced by Joyce.

He translated 60 books between 1944 and 1971. Among them the authors: Albert Schweitzer, Alphonse Daudet, Bertrand Russell, Dostoievski, Emil Ludwig, Erskine Caldwell, François Mauriac, Hemingway, Mark Twain, Mika Waltari, Níkos Kazantzákis, Pirandello, Stendhal, Thomas Merton and Tolstoy.

Writer 
As a writer, he noted the urban novel, in which conflicts of essentially national hues were found, although reconstructed from a metropolitan and international effervescence. In his fictional writings, cities such as São Paulo and Rio de Janeiro lose traces of familiarity and provincialism, commonly portrayed at the time.

Works 
In Portuguese.

 O Triste Epigrama (1919)
 A Ronda do Deslumbramento (1922)
 A Mulher que Fugiu de Sodoma (1931)
 Território Humano (1936)
 A Quadragésima Porta (1944)
 A Túnica e os Dados (1947)
 Carta à Minha Filha em Prantos (1946)
 A Ladeira da Memória (1949)
 O Albatroz (1951)
 Terreno Baldio (1961)
 Paralelo 16: Brasília (1967)
 A Mais que Branca (1973)
 Mansarda Acesa (1975)
 Crítica de Arte na Revista Habitat (posthumous, 2012)
 Impressões e expressões (posthumous, 2016)

References 

Brazilian writers
1897 births
1977 deaths